Le Courage d'aimer is a comedy-drama film directed by Claude Lelouch released on 29 June 2005. It is the result of a recutting of the first part (Les parisiens) of an unfinished trilogy - Le Genre humain with the scenes from the film that would have constituted the second film, called Le Bonheur, c'est mieux que la vie.

Synopsis
A picture of humankind in Paris "a la Lelouch" :  singers, shows, social gatherings, businessmen, nightclub barmen, bums, shoppers, etc.

Starring

 Mathilde Seigner as Anne / Clémentine
 Maïwenn as Shaa 
 Massimo Ranieri as Massimo
 Michel Leeb as Michel Gorkini 
 Arielle Dombasle as Sabine Duchemin
 Line Renaud as Line
 Yannick Soulier as Sami
 Pierre Arditi as Pierre  
 Ticky Holgado as God  
 Michèle Bernier as Tania  
 Francis Perrin as Didier 
 Grégori Derangère as The real estate agent 
 Lise Lamétrie as Lise 
 Eric Viellard as Francesco 
 Cyrielle Claire as Patricia 
 Agnès Soral as A spectator 
 André Falcon as The jewelry director 
 Charles Gérard as The jewelry client 
 Cristiana Reali as The jewelry saleswoman 
 Antoine Duléry as A restaurant owner
 Mireille Perrier as The woman on the docks
 Alexandra Kazan as Sylvie
 Thiam Aïssatou as Joséphine
 Pierre Santini as Jean-Claude Bénichou
 Salomé Lelouch as Bénichou's assistant
 Alessandra Martines as Alessandra
 Olivier Minne as Le présentateur des Victoires

References

External links
 
 

2005 films
Films about suicide
2005 comedy-drama films
Films directed by Claude Lelouch
French comedy-drama films
2000s French films